Gary Hudson may refer to:

 Gary Hudson (engineer), American aerospace engineer
 Gary Hudson (actor) (born 1956), American actor
 Gary Hudson (basketball) (1949–2009), American basketball coach